Kerberos Panzer Jäger (ケルベロス 鋼鉄の猟犬, Keruberosu kōtetsu no ryōken, lit. Kerberos Hound of Steel) is a 2006 radio drama series written by Japanese filmmaker and novelist Mamoru Oshii. It first aired in Nippon Cultural Broadcasting.

Story

Background information

Kerberos Panzer Jager is part of the Kerberos Saga multimedia franchise. While most of the saga's installments concern the downfall of the Tokyo police's armored Kerberos Unit, Kerberos Panzer Jager is a prequel set during an alternate World War II. In this timeline, the United States remained isolationist, refusing to enter the war, while the Empire of Japan allied itself with Britain and France against Nazi Germany. In this alternate timeline, Hitler has been successfully assassinated by Claus von Stauffenberg, leading to a purge of Nazi elements from the government. Advanced suits of powered armor, called 'Protect Gear', allow the Germans to win the Battle of Stalingrad. The term Panzer Jäger in the title refers not to tank-hunter units, as in real life, but to these armored infantry units, whose equipment goes on to form the basis for the Kerberos Unit's armor in later installments.

Plot

In September 1942, Captain Maki Stauffenberg, in command of the 808th Propagandakompanie, leaves Warsaw station on an armored train to start her long journey into Soviet territory. A filmmaker originally affiliated with UFA GmBH, she has been tasked with creating a propaganda film about the exploits of the 101st Panzer Jäger Battalion. Tainted by association with the displaced Nazi regime, the 101st has been committed to bloody frontline battles against the Soviets without respite, achieving stunning combat results in the process. However, Maki Stauffenberg, the half-Japanese niece of Hitler's killer, has taken on the mission for her own reasons.

Characters

Captain Maki Stauffenberg
Sergeant Major Hollerbach
Corporal Lauth
Captain Deisler
Major Klose
Sergeant Beinlich
Sergeant Kahn

Chapters

Interview program

2006.04.26: Interview Part.1: Radio drama's appeal
(ラジオドラマの魅力を探る)
2006.04.26: Interview Part.2: Listeners questions about Kerberos Panzer Jäger
(ケルベロス鋼鉄の猟犬)を語る
2006.04.26: Kenji Kawai & Mamoru Oshii
(川井憲次×押井守)

Drama program

Act I: Armoured Train
(装甲列車編, Sōkō ressha hen)
2006.04.31: Vol.1: Propagandakompanie (Propaganda Company)
 (宣伝中隊, Senden chūtai)
2006.06.28: Vol.2: Kursk
 (クルスク, Kurusuku)
2006.07.26: Vol.3: Kriegspferd (Charger)
 (軍馬, Gunba)

Act II: Panzer Jäger
(装甲猟兵, Sōkō ryoū hei)
2006.08.30: Vol.1: Die Langen Kerle Potsdam (Potsdam Giant Guards)
 (ポツダムの巨人兵, Potsudamu no kyojin hei)
2006.09.27: Vol.2: Die Dritte Armee (The Third Army)
 (第三の軍隊, Daisan no gunntai)

Act III: Blitzkrieg
(電撃戦, Dengeki sen)
2006.11.10: Vol.1: Blumenkrieg (Flower War)
 (花の戦争, Hana no sennsou)
2006.11.24: Vol.2: Westaufklärung (Study of the West)
 (西方研究, Seihō kenkyu)

Act IV: Barbarossa
(バルバロッサ, barubarossa)
2007.01.12: Vol.1: Säuberung (Purge)
 (粛清, Syukusei)

Licensed products

Books
 2007.04: Kerberos Panzer Jäger Official Guide Book (official guide book)
Japanese text, Mamoru Oshii, Barque, 32p.

Production

Cast
Yoshiko Sakakibara: Cpt. Maki Stauffenberg (マキ・シュタウフェンヴェルク大尉)
Michihiro Ikemizu: Sgt. Major Hollerbach (ホラーバッハ曹長)
Yuya Uchida: Cpl. Lauth (ラウト伍長)
Masashi Ebara: Cpt. Deisler (ダイスラー大尉)
Ikuya Sawaki: Mjr. Klose (クローゼ少佐)
Tetsuo Goto: Sgt. Beinlich (バインリヒ軍曹)
Otoya Kawano Sgt. Kahn (カーン軍曹)

Production staff
Original story / Scenario / Director: Mamoru Oshii
Music: Kenji Kawai
Sound director: Kazuhiro Wakabayashi
Recording: 宮澤二郎
Effects: 伊藤道広 (Soundring)
音楽制作: 安田玲子 /　仲野智子　/ 奥澤麻由美 /　大久保絵美 (Aube Inc.)
音響制作担当: 好永伸恵
音響制作: フォニシア
録音Studio: Tokyo TV Center
Supervisor:  小泉聰

Recording staff
Recording Engineer: Kitagawa Teruaki /　Kyouhei Fukushiro
Strings: 内田輝 Group　
A.Piano: Tohru Shigemi
Keyboards: Kenji Kawai
Recording studio: 一口坂 Studio /　Aube Studio /　i@ Recording Studio
Assistant Engineer: 山本篤士 /　中田武士 /　菊地和孝 (一口坂 Studio) / 長谷部智子 (Aube Studio) / 見留由紀 (i@ Recording Studio)

Musical theme
Die Antwort ("the answer"):
Composer:　Paolo Bozzola
Arrangement:　Kenji Kawai
Vocal:　Akane Kawabe

See also
Battle of Stalingrad
Operation Barbarossa
Battle of Kursk

Notes

The surnames of the German soldiers seem to be taken from professional soccer players Bernd Hollerbach, Benjamin Lauth, Sebastian Deisler, Miroslav Klose, Stefan Beinlich and Oliver Kahn.

On late May 2006, Mamoru Oshi announced plans to direct an anime adaptation of Kerberos Panzer Jäger, to be produced in 2009 with the use of 3DCG. However, there has been no recent news regarding this project. 

Images of the Last Battalion, a short CGI fan film produced in 2005 featuring German power armor suits in a WW2 setting, was screened at the Kerberos saga radio drama series launch party as a trailer.

Sources
 Kerberos Panzer Jäger official website (Japanese)
 Kerberos Panzer Jäger@Raiden Kinema channel 2 (kinema) (Japanese)
 Kerberos Panzer Jäger@Raiden Kinema channel 9 (archives) (Japanese)
 Mamoru Oshii's official website (Japanese)
 Kenji Kawai's official website (Japanese/English)
 JOQR Radio (Japanese)
 Images of the Last Battalion@Digital Frontier Grand Prix 2005 (Japanese)
 DCAJ Digital Contents Association of Japan (Japanese/English)
 Digital Hollywood (Japanese)
 Axis Animation (English)
 Watch Impress (Japanese)

External links
 Keruberosu Koutetsu No Ryōken Gaisetsu Wiki (Japanese)
 Kerberos saga official website (Japanese)

Japanese radio dramas
Kerberos saga
Military science fiction
World War II alternate histories